The following is a list of the governors and governors-general of New Zealand. As the personal representative of the New Zealand monarch, the governor-general performs many of the functions vested in the Crown, such as summoning and dissolving Parliament, granting or withholding the Royal assent, making state visits and receiving ambassadors. These functions are performed on the advice of the head of government, the prime minister.

Since the office was established in 1841, 37 individuals have served as governor, governor-in-chief (1848–1853), or governor-general (since 1917). Sir Arthur Porritt was the first New Zealand-born governor general, although he had been living in Britain for 31 years at the time of his appointment. All governors-general since Sir Denis Blundell in 1972 have been New Zealand residents and, with the exception of Sir David Beattie, New Zealand-born. The list does not include lieutenant-governors of the provinces of New Ulster and New Munster that existed between 1848 and 1853. The table also does not include administrators of the government, who fulfil vice-regal duties between the terms of governors-general, or at other times when the governor-general is overseas or otherwise unable to carry out the role. The role of administrator is normally undertaken by the chief justice.

List

Notes

References

Sources

External links
Official Website of the Governor-General of New Zealand
A history of the Governor-General in New Zealand
Rulers.org: Extensive list of Governors-General of New Zealand

New Zealand, Governor-General
Government of New Zealand
Constitution of New Zealand
Monarchy in New Zealand
Governor-General
 
Lists of office-holders in New Zealand